'Autumn field' is the capital city of Akita Prefecture, Japan, and has been designated a core city since 1 April 1997. , the city has an estimated population of 305,625, 136,628 households and a population density of 340 persons per km2.

History
The area of present-day Akita was part of ancient Dewa Province, and has been inhabited for thousands of years. The Jizōden ruins within the city limits are a major archaeological site with artifacts from the Japanese Paleolithic period through the Jōmon and Yayoi periods. During the Nara period, the Yamato court established Akita Castle in 733 AD to bring the local Emishi tribes under its control. The area was ruled by a succession of local samurai clans in the Sengoku period, before coming under the control of the Satake clan of Kubota Domain during the Edo period. Under the Tokugawa shogunate, a castle town developed around Kubota Castle.

Meiji and Taishō Eras
With the start of the Meiji period, Kubota Domain was abolished, and its castle town divided into the towns of Akita and Kubota. Akita Prefecture was established in 1871, and Shima Yoshitake was named the first governor. Ancient Akita District was divided into Kitaakita and Minamiakita Districts in 1878. Most of Akita town burned down in a great fire on 30 April 1886.

With the establishment of the modern municipalities system on 1 April 1889, the city of Akita was officially established, including former Kubota and Akita towns. The port area was separated into Tsuchizaki-Minato Town, which became part of Minamiakita District. The first city hall was located inside the former Minamiakita District office. In September 1898, the Imperial Japanese Army's 17th Infantry Regiment was based in Akita. The first public library was opened in 1898, electrification of Tsuchizaki began in 1901, and Akita Station was opened in 1902, as well as running water and telephone services in 1907.

The Taishō period brought further development to Akita with Nippon Oil Corporation developing the nearby Kurokawa Oil Fields in 1914, and a branch of the Bank of Japan opening in Akita in 1917.

Shōwa Era
In 1935, Nippon Kogyo (the forerunner of Jomo) began development of the nearby Yabase Oil Fields. Akita Bank was established in 1941.

War devastated the city on 14 August 1945. During the Tsuchizaki air raid, over 250 people were killed when 134 USAAF B-29 Superfortress, attacked the city from midnight to the early dawn. A Nippon Oil oil refinery in the Tsuchizaki area was targeted.

During the post-war period, the 16th National Sports Festival of Japan was held in Akita in 1961. During the tsunami following the 1983 Sea of Japan earthquake, three Akita residents were killed.

Heisei Era

On 1 April 1997, Akita was designated as a core city with increased autonomy. The Akita Shinkansen began operations the same year. In August 2001, the World Games were held in Akita, with the opening ceremony held in the Yabase Track and Field Stadium. In 2004, the city celebrated its 400th anniversary and its beginnings as Kubota Castle town.

On 11 January 2005, the towns of Kawabe and Yūwa (both from Kawabe District) were merged into Akita. Kawabe District was dissolved as a result of this merger. The location of Akita City Hall did not change, and former Kawabe and Yūwa Town Halls are used as civic centers. The 62nd National Sports Festival of Japan was held in Akita in 2007.

Geography
The city of Akita is located in the coastal plains of central Akita Prefecture, bordered by the Sea of Japan to the west. The Omono River runs through the center of the city.

Neighboring municipalities
Akita Prefecture
Kitaakita
Katagami
Yurihonjō
Daisen
Senboku
Minamiakita District: Gojōme, Ikawa
Kitaakita District: Kamikoani

Demography
Censuses have been conducted in Akita since as early as 1873. Per Japanese census data since 1950, the population of Akita peaked in around the year 2000 and has been in decline since then.

Climate
Akita belongs to a climatic transition zone humid subtropical climate (Köppen Cfa) and is the most populous city having absolute northern extremity of this climate zone within Japan, bordering very closely with the humid continental climate (Köppen Dfa) zone, comparable to New York City, USA. Akita is characterized with cold, very snowy, winters, and hot, humid summers. Precipitation is well-distributed and significant throughout the year, but is greater in the latter half. Over two thirds of all days see some precipitation, either rain or snow.

Government
Akita has a directly elected mayor and a unicameral  city assembly with 39 members. The city contributes 12 members to the Akita Prefectural Assembly.  In terms of national politics, the city is part of Akita District 1 of the lower house of the Diet of Japan.

Economy

The economy of Akita remains heavily dependent on agriculture (particularly rice cultivation), forestry and mineral extraction. Akita contains one of the most important oil fields in Japan. Oil refining, woodworking, metalworking, and the production of silk textiles are the main industries. Akita is also home to two regional banks that serve Akita prefecture and the greater Tōhoku region: Akita Bank and Hokuto Bank.

The Akita Thermal Power Station is located in the city.

Education

Universities
Akita University
Akita Prefectural University
Akita International University 
North Asia University
Seirei Women's Junior College
Japanese Red Cross Akita College of Nursing
Akita University of Art
Akita Nutrition Junior College
Misono Gakuen Junior College
Open University of Japan Akita learning center

Primary and secondary education
Akita has 44 city and one national elementary schools, 22 city, one prefectural, one national and one private middle schools, and one combined city middle/high school. There are eight prefectural, one city and seven private high schools, as well as four prefectural and one national special education school.

High schools
Akita High School

Transportation

Airports
Akita Airport

Railway
JR East – Akita Shinkansen
Akita
 East Japan Railway Company - Ōu Main Line
  -  -  -  -  -  -  
 East Japan Railway Company - Uetsu Main Line
  -  -  -  - 
 East Japan Railway Company - Oga Line
 
Akita Rinkai Railway Company  (freight)

Highway

Bus

Seaports
Port of Akita

Mass media
Akita Asahi Broadcasting
Akita Broadcasting System
Akita Community Broadcasting
Akita Television
Cable Networks Akita
FM Tsubakidai

Local attractions 

Site of Kubota Castle (Senshu Park)
Site of Akita Castle (Takashimizu Park), National Historic Site
Minato Castle (Tsuchizaki Gaiku Park, Shinmeisha)
Jizōden ruins, National Historic Site
Akita Prefectural Museum
Akita Senshū Museum of Art
Akita Museum of Art
Akita Omoriyama Zoo
Akita Port Tower Selion
CNA Arena Akita
Sakigake Yabase Baseball Stadium
Akita Prefectural Baseball Stadium
Akita Yabase Athletic Field
Akita Prefectural Gymnasium
Akita Prefectural Central Park
Akita Prefectural General Pool
Akita Prefectural Budokan
 Akita Peace Pagoda
Koshiō Shrine

Local events

Akita Kanto Festival

This representative summer festival began 350 years ago, with similar to tanabata festivals held elsewhere in Japan. During this festival, participants balance 15 meter poles with 230 lanterns on their chins; the main event is held during the evening and night hours, between the 3rd and 6 August each year.

During the festival, Kanto stunt events are held in Senshu Park during daylight hours involving many amateur participants. This event was first held in 1931 and every subsequent year, except between 1935 and 1946 and in 1953 and 1965.  Overseas exhibitions of the festival were performed in Hamburg, Germany, in 1988, Honolulu, Hawaii, in 2002, London, UK, in 2004, and as an opening event at the 2001 World Games.

Narayama Kamakura Festival

In the Narayama Otamachi district of central Akita each February 12–15 a Shinto festival honoring 
both Suijin and Kamakura Daimyojin is held inside a shrine made from walls of snow. A rice bale
is set afire at the end of this festival.

Tsuchizaki Minato Festival

Each neighbourhood in Tsuchizaki Minato contributes a float decorated with giant figures from 20 to 21 July. In 1997 it was designated an Important Intangible Folk Cultural Property.

Marian apparitions
Our Lady of Akita is the title of Marian apparitions reported in 1973 by Sister Agnes Katsuko Sasagawa in Yuzawadai, Soegawa, Akita City. The apparitions were approved by the Holy See in 1988. The 1988 approval was issued by Cardinal Joseph Ratzinger, who later became Pope Benedict XVI.

Sister city relations

International sister / friendship cities
  - Lanzhou, Gansu, China, since August 5, 1982
  - Passau, Lower Bavaria, Germany, since 8 April 1984
 -  Malabon, Philippines,  since 15 July 1987
 - Kenai, Alaska, United States of America
 - St. Cloud, Minnesota, United States of America (with Yūwa, Akita, which merged into Akita, Akita), since 1993
 - Vladivostok, Primorsky Krai, Russia, since 29 June 1992

Domestic sister cities
Hitachiōta, Ibaraki Prefecture
Daigo, Kuji District Ibaraki

Notable people
Masamichi Amano, composer 
Michio Ashikaga, professional soccer player
Yukiko Ebata, professional women's volleyball player
Hiroki Endo, manga artist
Yukio Endō, Olympic gymnast
Hiroyuki Enoki, professional boxer
Shirō Fukai, composer
Takunosuke Funakawa, footballer
Masanori Ishikawa, professional baseball player
Taka Kato, adult movie actor
Chūji Machida, politician, cabinet minister
Hiroya Matsumoto, actor
Hiroko Nagasaki, Olympic swimmer
Emiko Okuyama, politician
Akira Ota, Olympic wrestler
Junko Sakurada, singer
Nozomi Sasaki, model, actress
Takenori Sato, professional mixed martial artist
Tadashi Settsu, professional baseball player
Kohei Shimoda, professional soccer player
Taro Shoji, singer
, basketball player
Kenji Suzuki (footballer)
Mitsuhisa Taguchi, professional soccer player
Kenta Tateyama, professional basketball player
Go Togashi, footballer for Blaublitz Akita
Setsurō Wakamatsu, movie director
Ren Yamamoto (footballer, born 1999)
Koharu Yonemoto, professional badminton player

Sports
Basketball: Akita Northern Happinets, Prestige International Aranmare Akita 
Football: Blaublitz Akita, Saruta Kōgyō S.C., Akita FC Cambiare 
Rugby union: Akita Northern Bullets

Notes

External links

Official Website 

 
Cities in Akita Prefecture
Populated coastal places in Japan
Port settlements in Japan